Soul City Sirens (SCS) is a women's flat track roller derby league based in Augusta, Georgia. Founded in 2008, the league consists of a single team, which competes against teams from other leagues. Soul City is a member of the Women's Flat Track Derby Association (WFTDA).

History
The league was founded in January 2008 by Jessica Thompson, a local librarian, and played its first bout in January 2009.  By 2013, it was averaging 350 fans at each bout, and had developed a particular rivalry with the Richland County Regulators.

Soul City was accepted into the Women's Flat Track Derby Association Apprentice Program in July 2011, and in March 2013, it became a full member of the WFTDA.

Since 2013, Soul City has hosted the annual Low Down Throw Down WFTDA-recognized tournament, drawing teams from across the southeastern United States.

WFTDA rankings

References

Roller derby leagues established in 2008
Roller derby leagues in Georgia (U.S. state)
Sports in Augusta, Georgia
Women's Flat Track Derby Association Division 3
2008 establishments in Georgia (U.S. state)